Manam Kothi Paravai is a 2012 Indian Tamil-language romantic comedy film written and directed by Ezhil, starring Sivakarthikeyan and Athmiya Rajan. D. Imman has scored the music. The film opened to moderate reviews from critics, but it was the first commercial hit in Sivakarthikeyan's career. The film was remade in Kannada as Anjada Gandu (2014) and in Telugu as Vinavayya Ramayya.

Plot
Kannan (Sivakarthikeyan) is a carefree youth who assists his father Ramaiah (Ilavarasu) in his construction business. He spends time with his friends Nalla Thambi (Soori), Modu Mutti (Singampuli), and M. R. Kishore Kumar.

Kannan is in love with his neighbour Revathy (Athmiya Rajan), whose father and uncles are the most dreaded goons in the village. They are both childhood friends. He gets a shocker when he decides to reveal his love to Revathy. Her family has arranged her a marriage with an influential man. To avoid the arranged marriage, Kannan's friends from Mumbai (Nayar (Srinath) and Chaams) kidnap Revathy.

There is a twist in the tale. Revathy declares she has no romantic interest over Kannan. "He is just a friend", says the girl at first. But later reveals that she loves Kannan too, so much so that if others knew it, it'd be a problem to him and prove to be a risk to his life.

Meanwhile, the bride-to-be's family searches frantically to find their girl. They get hold of Kannan and his friends. Revathy and Kannan are separated.

After two years, Kannan returns from Oman after having worked as a site engineer there, to meet his love. He meets her with avidity and they talk for a while when she asks him to leave immediately, for fear that her father would harm him. Kannan, still a passionate lover, asks Revathy if they could marry, now that she's not married to anybody else.

Revathy's father barges in unexpectedly and asks Kannan to leave the house, but with Revathy.

Cast
Sivakarthikeyan as Kannan
Athmiya Rajan as Revathy
Ravi Mariya as Natraj, Revathy's brother
Ilavarasu as Ramaiah
Singampuli as Modu Mutti
Soori as Nalla Thambi
Srinath as Nayar
Aadukalam Naren as Revathy's father
Vennira Aadai Moorthy as Nayar's grandfather
Vanitha Krishnachandran as Thirumathi
Sugunthan as Landlord
Chaams as Kannan's friend
 M. R. Kishore Kumar as Kannan's friend
Jay Kumar
Anbarasan

Production
Producer Ambeth Kumar and Ranjeev Menon are friends of director Ezhil. When they asked him how the shooting of Manam Kothi Paravai was proceeding, he made them listen to the songs tuned by D. Imman. Impressed, they decided to produce it.

It was initially expected that Yuvan Shankar Raja, whom Ezhil had worked with in his previous release Deepavali, would compose the music, but as the budget of this film could not afford to have Yuvan as the music composer, Ezhil opted for D. Imman. After the lead role in Marina and an important role in the recently released 3, Sivakarthikeyan is taking up a full-fledged lead role again for Manam Kothi Paravai.

The film, which is set in a village, has been shot at Ezhil's native place Kayathur, near Mayavaram and Siva Karthikeyan's Thiruvizhimizhalai.

Soundtrack

The music of Manam Kothi Paravai was scored by D. Imman. The soundtrack was released on 12 April 2012, which features 8 tracks with lyrics written by Yugabharathi. Universal Music is back in the Tamil market after a 30-year hiatus with 'Manam Kothi Paravai'.

Critical reception
Behindwoods wrote: "Imman has a winner with this movie". Milliblog wrote: "Manam Kothi Paravai’s soundtrack surpasses anything that composer Imman has produced so far, including his most famous soundtrack, Mynaa. The tunes and music he puts together here demonstrate a maturity not seen in the composer’s work so far and makes for fantastic listen."The Hindu wrote:"MKP is a comedy it turns serious and when you settle down for the drama, matters turn ludicrous. Consistency in treatment is a casualty". Sify wrote:"On the whole the film fails to deliver". Behindwoods wrote:"Manam Kothi Paravai moves at a very relaxed pace. With not too many events packed into it, the movie might come across as a long haul if you are looking for a love story that is both entertaining and endearing. Parts of it are entertaining and parts of it, endearing".The Times of India rated 2.5 out of 5 stars stating "Ezhil seems to have tried to do a Kalavani here but those familiar with his repertoire will realize he is more comfortable with melodrama".IndiaGlitz rated 0 out of 5 stars stating "On the whole, the movie may resemble the likes of 'Kalavani' and 'Uthamaputhiran'. But forget the lengthy second half and some clichéd sequences, 'Manam Koththi Paravai' will stick to your hearts".The New Indian Express stated "A romantic comedy low on humour".

References

Films shot in Ooty
2012 films
Tamil films remade in other languages
2010s Tamil-language films
Films directed by Ezhil